Staying Alive is a 2012 Hindi-language social film directed by Anant Mahadevan, featuring Anant Mahadevan, Saurabh Shukla, Chandan Roy Sanyal in the lead roles. The film's music was composed by Sanjay Chowdhury.Art Director Tarun Agasty. The film was released.. on 3 February 2012.

Plot
The story is about two men who suffer a heart attack and share the hospital room. Aditya (Ananth Mahadevan) is a newspaper editor who has already survived two strokes in the past and has somewhat adapted to the crisis. Shaukat Ali (Saurabh Shukla), an underworld kingpin who has often witnessed death closely, gets paranoid with his first heart-attack. The story is about their interactions and exchange of ideas in the ICU room that changes Ali's perspective towards life.

Cast
Anant Mahadevan
Saurabh Shukla
Chandan Roy Sanyal
Sanjay Swaraj
Navni Parihar
Ranjana Sasa
Khan Jahangir Khan

Critical reception
The film received mixed reviews from critics. Taran Adarsh from Bollywood Hungama gave the film 2/5 and said "On the whole, Staying Alive is more of an experiment that holds appeal for a tiny segment of cineastes – those with an appetite for meaningful, festival films". Avijit Ghosh from The Times of India gave it 3/5 stating that "Staying Alive is a subtle yet engrossing human drama".

References

External links

2010s Hindi-language films
2012 masala films
Films scored by Sanjoy Chowdhury
Films shot in the United Arab Emirates
Films directed by Anant Mahadevan